Jorge Manuel Dengo Obregón was a civil engineer from Costa Rica who served as First Vice President of Costa Rica. He was elected as Vice President in February 2, 1986. He played a leading role in the founding of the Costa Rican Electricity Institute.

Personal life 
He was born in Heredia, Costa Rica in 19 February 1918 and was one of the founders of the Instituto Costarricense de Electricidad in 1949 and became its first General Manager. In 23 January 2012, he died in the age of 93.

Award and Honor 

 In 2012, He got Outstanding Lifetime Achievement Award in Public Works by American Society of Civil Engineers for his public service in engineering and economic development in Central America.
 He is also recipient of Honorary Degree of Doctor of Laws by University of Minnesota.
 The Highest Technology Award in Costa Rica, Jorge Manuel Dengo Award is named after him. It was created by XXI Century Strategy Award Organization.

References 

1918 births
Vice presidents of Costa Rica
2012 deaths